Kumarganj College is a general degree college at Kumarganj  in the Dakshin Dinajpur district of West Bengal, India. The college is affiliated to University of Gour Banga. This college offers undergraduate courses in arts.

See also

References

External links
Kumarganj College
University of Gour Banga
University Grants Commission
National Assessment and Accreditation Council

Colleges affiliated to University of Gour Banga
Universities and colleges in Dakshin Dinajpur district
2016 establishments in West Bengal
Educational institutions established in 2016